Malatius Jibriel Jaghnoon, (born in Lattakia 1943), is a Syrian engineer and epigrapher specialized in Aramaic and Greek inscriptions.

Career
He was born in Syria to a Greek Orthodox family. He graduated as a civil engineer from the University of Aleppo in 1968. His interest in epigraphy led him to learn several ancient languages and he mastered Aramaic and Greek among others. Jaghnoon is also an expert in the Ancient South Arabian script. His epigraphical work inside Syria includes the deciphering of an inscription found on a Roman era sarcophagus from Homs, a number of Syriac and Greek inscriptions from an ancient church in Tal Eltiten, an inscription from Maarrat al-Nu'man and an inscription from the agora of Palmyra. He is a founding member of The Archaeological Society of Homs and was elected as head of the society in 2011.

Selected publications

References

Citations

Sources

1943 births
Syrian scholars
Epigraphers
Hellenic epigraphers
Living people